Agrotis syricola is a moth of the family Noctuidae. It is found in the eastern part of Mediterranean Basin, more specifically southern Italy, Greece, southern Bulgaria, the Mediterranean part of Turkey, Jordan and Israel.

Adults are on wing from February to April and October and November. There are multiple generations per year.

External links
Lepiforum.de

Agrotis
Moths of Europe
Moths of the Middle East
Moths described in 1933